The 1997–98 Utah Utes men's basketball team represented the University of Utah as a member of the Western Athletic Conference during the 1997–98 men's basketball season. Led by head coach Rick Majerus, the Utes made a run through the NCAA tournament all the way to the National Championship Game and finished with an overall record of 30–4 (12–2 WAC).

Including the previous season, Utah won 59 of 67 games overall and 27 of 30 games in conference play.

Roster

Schedule and results

|-
!colspan=9 style=| Non-conference regular season
|-

|-
!colspan=9 style=| WAC regular season
|-

|-
!colspan=9 style=| WAC Tournament
|-

|-
!colspan=9 style=| NCAA Tournament
|-

Rankings

Team players in the 1998 NBA draft

References

External links
 1998 NCAA Basketball National Championship Utah vs Kentucky

Utah Utes men's basketball seasons
Utah
NCAA Division I men's basketball tournament Final Four seasons
Utah
Utah Utes
Utah Utes